Soufiane Bouftini is a Moroccan professional footballer who plays for Al Wasl as a defender.

Honors

Club
Hassania Agadir
Moroccan Throne Cup runner-up: 2019
Al Wasl Club Dubai - UAE 2022

International

Morocco
African Nations Championship : 2020

References

External links
 

1994 births
Living people
Footballers from Casablanca
Moroccan footballers
Moroccan expatriate footballers
Morocco international footballers
Association football defenders
Hassania Agadir players
Al Ahli SC (Doha) players
Botola players
Qatar Stars League players
2020 African Nations Championship players
Expatriate footballers in Qatar
Moroccan expatriate sportspeople in Qatar
Morocco A' international footballers